The Icelandic Sportsperson of the Year is an annual award given to the best Icelandic sportsperson of the year. The winner is selected by the Icelandic Association of Sports Journalists. It was first given in 1956 to the triple jumper Vilhjálmur Einarsson, who is also the person with the most awards with five. Traditionally, the award is given at the Sportsperson of the Year Ball which is attended by journalists and sportspeople.

Icelandic Sportspeople of the Year

References

External links
Icelandic Sportsperson of the Year website 

National sportsperson-of-the-year trophies and awards
Sportsperson
Sport in Iceland
Awards established in 1956
1956 establishments in Iceland